The Aniniș is a left tributary of the river Ciocadia in Romania. It flows into the Ciocadia in the village Ciocadia.

References

Rivers of Romania
Rivers of Gorj County